The 400 metres hurdles at the Summer Olympics is the longest hurdling event held at the multi-sport event. The men's 400 m hurdles has been present on the Olympic athletics programme since 1900, with a sole gap at the 1912 Summer Olympics. The women's event was added to the programme over eighty years later, at the 1984 Olympics. It is the most prestigious 400 m hurdles race at elite level.

The Olympic records for the event are 45.94 seconds for men, set by Karsten Warholm in 2021, and 51.46 seconds for women, set by Sydney McLaughlin in 2021. The record has been broken at the Olympics on eight occasions: 1908 (the first official IAAF record), 1920, 1932, 1968, 1972, 1976, 1992, and 2021. The women's world record had never been broken in Olympic competition prior to 2021.

Edwin Moses is the most successful athlete in the event, having won two gold and one bronze medal. Glenn Davis, Angelo Taylor and Felix Sanchez have also won two Olympic 400 m hurdles titles. Morgan Taylor is the only other athlete beside Moses that has won three medals in the event. Deon Hemmings is the most successful woman, with her 1996 gold and 2000 silver medals, and is the only female athlete to win multiple medals. It is relatively common for 400 m hurdles athletes to also be part of their nation's team for the 4×400 metres relay at the Olympics.

The United States is the most successful nation in the men's event. American men have swept the medals on five occasions. The American women have the highest medal total, with nine, but the nation managed to achieve its first victory only in 2016, when Dalilah Muhammad won the event. Russia and Jamaica are the only nations to win multiple women's gold medals, with two each. Great Britain is the first nation to have won a gold medal in both the men's and women's event, having three champions in total. In 2016, the United States became the second.

Medal summary

Men

Multiple medalists

Medals by country

Women

Multiple medalists

Medalists by country

Finishing times

Top ten fastest Olympic times

SF - Semi-Finals

References
Participation and athlete data
Athletics Men's 400 metres Hurdles Medalists. Sports Reference. Retrieved on 2014-02-07.
Athletics Women's 400 metres Hurdles Medalists. Sports Reference. Retrieved on 2014-02-07.
Olympic record progressions
Mallon, Bill (2012). TRACK & FIELD ATHLETICS - OLYMPIC RECORD PROGRESSIONS. Track and Field News. Retrieved on 2014-02-07.
Specific

External links
IAAF 400 metres hurdles homepage
Official Olympics website
Olympic athletics records from Track & Field News

 
Olympics
400 metres hurdles